The 10,000 metre speed skating event was part of the speed skating at the 1952 Winter Olympics programme. It was the last speed skating contest at this Games. The competition was held on Tuesday, 19 February 1952, at 10 a.m. Thirty speed skaters from 12 nations competed.

Medalists

Records
These were the standing world and Olympic records (in minutes) prior to the 1952 Winter Olympics.

(*) The record was set on naturally frozen ice.

Four speed skaters were faster than the standing Olympic record. Hjalmar Andersen set a new Olympic record with 16:45.8 minutes.

Results

Yoshiyasu Gomi fell once and Egbert van 't Oever fell twice. Ingar Nordlund and Johnny Werket gave up.

References

External links
Official Olympic Report
 

Speed skating at the 1952 Winter Olympics